Traitors of San Angel (Spanish:Los traidores de San Ángel) is a 1967 action film directed by Leopoldo Torre Nilsson and starring Ian Hendry, Lautaro Murúa and Graciela Borges. It was a co-production between Argentina, Chile, Mexico, Puerto Rico and United States.

Cast
 Ian Hendry as Nick Thomas  
 Lautaro Murúa as Fonseca  
 Graciela Borges as Marina  
 Maurice Evans as James Keefe  
 Enrique Lucero as Rodriguez  
 Esther Sandoval as Dona Consuelo  
 José de San Antón as Director Carcel

References

Bibliography 
 Peter Cowie & Derek Elley. World Filmography: 1967. Fairleigh Dickinson University Press, 1977.

External links 
 

1967 films
1960s action films
Chilean action films
Mexican action films
Argentine action films
1960s Spanish-language films
Films directed by Leopoldo Torre Nilsson
1960s Mexican films